Aminio Baledrokadroka was the charismatic leader of Fiji's Methodist (Wesleyan) missionary band to New Britain Island, Papua New Guinea in the latter part of the nineteenth century. He displayed excellent qualities of leadership in adversity and paved the way for later generations of native Fijian missionaries in spreading  Christianity to other parts of Papua New Guinea and the Solomon Islands.

Life
The mission to New Britain was launched in August 1875, just forty years after the first Wesleyan missionaries Cargill and Cross brought Christianity to Fiji's shores in 1835. Just months after the tragic measles epidemic which killed 40,000 in Fiji, Reverend George Brown the Methodist missionary, appealed to the students of Navuloa Methodist Mission School, to embark on spreading the Christian gospel to their Melanesian brethren. Reverend George Brown, emphasized to the zealous native Fijian converts the dangers involved in missionary work and pointed out that they might well be going to their deaths.
Eighty three students who attended the mission school were present and heard Brown's appeal. They were  cautioned to consult with their wives and families in deciding to volunteer for the mission. It is recorded in the Fiji Methodist Church which was then governed by the New South Wales Australia Wesleyan synod, that the whole student body as enrolled at Navuloa, offered to go and spread the faith.

The colonial  government of the day was not keen on  the mounting of the mission, most probably wanting to limit out-migration of natives as the population had been  devastated  by the measles epidemic earlier that year. A  hand picked few were finally chosen  by Brown and cleared by the colonial government. They left the shores of Fiji, true to their evangelical calling some never to return. By 1876 the new mission field in New Guinea which originally consisted of fourteen teacher's stations  had been divided into two areas, one under Rev. Baledrokadroka and the other under Rev.Sailasa Naucukidi.

Martyrdom

In the year 1878, Reverend Sailasa Naucukidi journeyed inland from the northern coast of  New Britain with a small party preaching the Gospel. On 6 April at Tanaka, Reverend Naucukidi was suddenly attacked and slain, and his body dismembered and cannibalized. Consequently, three other Fijian missionaries; Reverend Livai Naboro, Reverend Peni Luvu and Layman Timoci Baravi were slain at Talakua in what is now Tungnaparau. Rev Luvu managed to break free from the ambush after he defended himself with a club he grabbed from one of the attackers. He sadly did not reach his  Vunela home  as he was met along the way by Chief Talili who after offering him a kalau, beheaded him while he was taking a drink. After the tragedy the remains of the missionaries were later repossessed by Rev. Dr. George Brown, who with local converts carried out retaliatory actions for the murders. At the end of a six-day campaign those responsible for the killings and cannibalizing  of the Fijian missionaries surrendered. 
  
The accounts of Aminio Baledrokadroka's deep faith  and tales of his miraculous deeds are legendary  in the  Methodist Church of Fiji. He and his wife Lavenia Tupou returned to Fiji in 1885. He finally  retired to his village, in Nasaqalau, Lakeba, Lau where he lies buried. Reverend Aminio Baledrokadroka and his fellow Fijian missionaries proselytization legacy and  martyrdom  is today honored in  Kabakada village and the Province of East New Britain. A memorial  monument was erected on top of the buried remains of the four slain martyrs  on Vunela hilltop on 15 August 1975, the one hundredth anniversary of the arrival of the Fijian missionaries in the New Guinea islands. The burial site now known as the Fijian Cemetery holds 41 graves which are now part of the Vunela historical tourism site.

Pioneering Native Fijian Missionaries to Papua New Guinea and the Solomon Islands

1. Aminio Baledrokadroka, departed Fiji Aug 1875 for New Britain, returned accompanied by wife Lavenia Tupou 1885.

2. Ratu Livai Volavola, departed Fiji Aug 1875 for New Britain, returned accompanied by wife 1889.

3. Ilimotama Ravono, departed Fiji Aug 1875 for New Ireland, married wife from New Ireland.

4. Peni Luvu, departed Fiji Aug 1875 for New Britain, martyred 1878, wife Lavenia returned to Fiji 1878.

5. Mitieli Vakaloloma, departed Fiji Aug 1875 for New Britain, died at sea 1881, two wives died in New Britain.

6. Pauliasi Bunoa, departed Fiji Aug 1875 for New Ireland, returned 1884 wife Seini died in 1883.

7. Timoci Lesei, departed Fiji Aug 1875 for New Britain, died 30/11/1875.
	
8. Penisimani Caumia, departed Fiji for New Britain Aug 1875, returned 1881, two wives died in New Britain.

9. Sailasa Naucukidi, departed Fiji for New Britain 1876, martyred 1878, wife Mere returned to Fiji 1878.

10. Peni Raiwalui, departed Fiji for New Britain 1876, died 1881, wife Naina returned Fiji 1883.

11. Sociceni Raquru, departed Fiji for New Britain 1876, returned 1878 accompanied by wife.

12. Sioni Ratunikula, departed Fiji 1876 for New Britain.

References

 THORNLEY, Andrew, 1982, ‘Custom, Change and Conflict: Fiji Wesleyan missionaries, 1835–1945’, in Melanesia: beyond diversity, vol.1, eds R.J. May and Hank Nelson, Research School of Pacific Studies, Australian National University, Canberra.
 TIPPETT, A.R., 1954, The Christian (Fiji 1835–1867), Auckland Institute and Museum, Auckland.

Methodist missionaries in Papua New Guinea
Fijian Methodist missionaries
Fijian expatriates in Papua New Guinea
People from Lakeba